John Stuart Parsons (born 10 December 1950) is a Welsh former professional footballer.

Career

Parsons was born in Cardiff, and began his career at his hometown club Cardiff City, turning professional in 1968. However, he had to wait until February 1971 to make his debut for the club when he scored twice in consecutive substitute appearances against Oxford United and Sunderland and was handed his first start soon after. Despite being a prolific scorer in the reserve team, Parsons never managed to hold down a regular place in the first team due to the wealth of striking talent in the likes of Brian Clark, John Toshack and Alan Warboys and, in February 1973, left to join Bournemouth. His time at Bournemouth was severely hampered by injuries and he had made just 8 league appearances when he returned to Wales to sign for Newport County in March 1975. His spell at Newport was his most successful spell in The Football League, spending two seasons as a regular in the side before moving into non-league football.

References

External links

1950 births
Living people
Footballers from Cardiff
Welsh footballers
Cardiff City F.C. players
AFC Bournemouth players
Newport County A.F.C. players
English Football League players
Association football forwards